Seti Highway (also referred to as H15) is a highway, in the western region of Nepal. This highway links the towns of Amargadhi, the district headquarter of Dadeldhura and Dipayal Silgadhi, the district headquarter of Doti.

The 66 km long highway begins in Amargadhi, where it branches off Mahakali Highway. It runs along Seti River and ends in Dipayal Silgadhi.

References

Highways in Nepal